Christine Mary Campbell (born 30 November 1953) is an Australian politician.

Education

Born in Melbourne, Campbell graduated with a Bachelor of Arts and a Diploma of Education from La Trobe University. She later was Head of the National Women's Bureau in the Shop Distributive Association from 1974–80. She became an emergency teacher and adult migrant teacher in 1981, and joined the Labor Party in 1983. In 1989 she became an electorate officer, and from 1992 to 1995 manager of the Caroline Chisholm Society.

Political career

In 1996, Campbell was elected to the Victorian Legislative Assembly as the member for Pascoe Vale, succeeding Kelvin Thomson, who was elected to the federal seat of Wills. Campbell immediately became Shadow Minister for Family Services and Women's Affairs, and in 1999 moved to the Community Services portfolio. Later that year, when Labor won government under Steve Bracks, Campbell became the Minister, and in 2002 became Minister for Senior Victorians and Consumer Affairs.

She lists her interests as bushwalking, cycling and bioethics.

Christine Campbell voted against what is now the Abortion Law Reform Act 2008. She remains actively opposed to abortion, arguing in favour of doctors who, contrary to the Act, fail to refer patients seeking abortions.

References

1953 births
Living people
Australian Labor Party members of the Parliament of Victoria
Members of the Victorian Legislative Assembly
21st-century Australian politicians
Women members of the Victorian Legislative Assembly
Politicians from Melbourne
21st-century Australian women politicians